Poecilarcys is a genus of African orb-weaver spiders containing the single species, Poecilarcys ditissimus. It was first described by Eugène Simon in 1895 to hold the single species moved from the now obsolete "catch-all" genus Epeira. It has only been found in Tunisia.

References

Araneidae
Monotypic Araneomorphae genera
Spiders of Africa
Taxa named by Eugène Simon